The third season of The Twilight Zone aired Fridays at 10:00–10:30 pm (EST) on CBS from September 15, 1961 to June 1, 1962. There are 37 episodes. 

Continuing with Marius Constant's theme music, a different set of graphics was used for the opening, consisting of a rotating cone with concentric circles suggesting a spiral, receding into a star field. Rod Serling's narration from the second season was used, with the verse "That's the signpost up ahead" taken out:

"You're traveling through another dimension. A dimension not only of sight and sound but of mind. A journey into a wondrous land whose boundaries are that of imagination. Your next stop—The Twilight Zone." Some subtle changes in the opening's acoustics were made beginning with "Little Girl Lost".

Episodes

References

 

1961 American television seasons
1962 American television seasons
59 series